Highway 935 is a provincial highway in the north-west region of the Canadian province of Saskatchewan. It runs from Highway 165 into the Lac La Ronge First Nation. Highway 935 is about 8 km (5 mi) long.

See also 
Roads in Saskatchewan
Transportation in Saskatchewan

References 

935